The following lists events in the year 2011 in Hungary.

Incumbents
President: Pál Schmitt
Prime Minister: Viktor Orbán

Events

 17–21 August: 2011 ICF Canoe Sprint World Championships in Szeged, Hungary
 23 September: Hungary establishes diplomatic relations with South Sudan

Deaths

January

 10 January – Miklós Hofer, 79, Hungarian architect.
 11 January – Zoltán Berczik, 73, Hungarian table tennis player and coach.

February

 19 February – Ernő Solymosi, 70, Hungarian Olympic bronze medal-winning (1960) football player.
 24 February – Attila Takács, 82, Hungarian Olympic gymnast.
 25 February – István Jenei, 57, Hungarian Olympic sports shooter.

March

 16 March – Sándor Arnóth, 51, Hungarian politician, car accident.
 29 March – Endre Wolf, 97, Hungarian violinist.

April

May

 3 May – Marianna Nagy, 82, Hungarian pair skater.
 29 May – Ferenc Mádl, 80, Hungarian politician, President of the Republic (2000–2005).

June

 10 June – György Szabados, 71, Hungarian physician, pianist, and composer.
 18 June – Benedek Litkey, 69, Hungarian Olympic sailor.
 19 June – Rezső Kende, 102, Hungarian Olympic gymnast.

July

 4 July – Éva Sebők-Szalay, 62, Hungarian Olympic volleyball player.
 5 July – George Lang, 86, Hungarian-born American restaurateur and cookbook author, Alzheimer's disease.
 16 July – Bertalan Bicskei, 66, Hungarian footballer and coach.
 27 July – Agota Kristof, 75, Hungarian-born French novelist.

August

 24 August – Jenő Gerbovits, 86, Hungarian politician, minister without portfolio (1990–1991), tractor accident.

September

 3 September – Sándor Képíró, 97, Hungarian World War II veteran acquitted of Nazi war crimes.
 17 September – Ferenc Szojka, 80, Hungarian footballer.
 18 September – Imre Varga, 66, Hungarian Olympic judoka.
 27 September – Imre Makovecz, 75, Hungarian architect.

October

 4 October – Géza Tóth, 79, Hungarian Olympic silver medal-winning (1964) weightlifter.
 7 October – Andrew Laszlo, 85, Hungarian-born American cinematographer (First Blood, The Warriors, Newsies).
 12 October – János Herskó, 85, Hungarian film director and actor.
 13 October – Irén Daruházi-Karcsics, 84, Hungarian Olympic silver (1948, 1952) and bronze (1952) medal-winning gymnast.
 31 October – Flórián Albert, 70, Hungarian footballer, European Footballer of the Year (1967).

November

 3 November – Tamás Eszes, 47, Hungarian politician and paramilitary leader, suicide.
 6 November – Géza Alföldy, 76, Hungarian historian.
 26 November 
 Judit Bognár, 72, Hungarian Olympic athlete.
 István Gajda, 30, Hungarian football player, road accident.
 Iván Menczel, 69, Hungarian Olympic gold-medal winning (1968) footballer.

December

 24 December
 István Jutasi, 82, Hungarian Olympic sailor Olympedia – István Jutasi
 Zsuzsi Mary, 64, Hungarian pop singer, suicide.
 25 December – Ferenc Schmidt, 70, Hungarian politician.
 30 December
 Dezső Garas, 77, Hungarian actor.
 Eva Zeisel, 105, Hungarian-born American ceramic artist and designer.

See also
 List of Hungarian films since 1990

References

 
2010s in Hungary
Years of the 21st century in Hungary
Hungary
Hungary